Thawatchai Aocharod (born 20 January 2003) is a Thai professional footballer who plays as a midfielder  for Thai League 1 club Nongbua Pitchaya.

Club career
In October 2021, Thawatchai made his senior debut in Thai League 1 for Nongbua Pitchaya against Chiangrai United.

References

External links

2003 births
Living people
Thawatchai Aocharod
Thawatchai Aocharod
Association football midfielders
Thawatchai Aocharod
Thawatchai Aocharod
Thawatchai Aocharod
Thai expatriate footballers
Thai expatriate sportspeople in England
Expatriate footballers in England